Atomosia glabrata is a species of robber flies in the family Asilidae.

References

glabrata
Articles created by Qbugbot